The 1976–77 Hamburger SV season was the 30th season in the club's history and the 14th consecutive season playing in the Bundesliga. Hamburg competed in this season's editions of the Bundesliga, DFB-Pokal, and European Cup Winners' Cup.

Season summary
HSV qualified for this season's European Cup Winners' Cup by having won the DFB-Pokal in the previous season. The club reached the final of the competition for the second time in club history, their first being a loss to Italian side Milan in 1967–68. HSV defeated Belgian side Anderlecht in the final on 11 May 1977, winning the match 2–0 thanks to goals by Georg Volkert and Felix Magath.

Competitions

Overall record

Bundesliga

League table

DFB Pokal

European Cup Winners' Cup

References

Hamburger SV seasons
Hamburger
UEFA Cup Winners' Cup-winning seasons